GHSI may refer to:

Global Health Security Initiative, an informal international partnership coordinating to confront new threats and risks to global health
Global Health Security Index, an assessment of global health security capabilities in 195 countries